The BMW B37 is a , diesel, 3 cylinder engine with a single, mono-scroll and VTG turbocharger. The compression ratio is 16.5:1. It is the second engine from BMW's modular engine plan sharing most of its components with the BMW B38 petrol engine. Power output is either .

Models  

* Depending on engine management.

Technical data from BMW 2 Series Active Tourer, MINI 3 Door, MINI 5 Door., MINI 3 Door

Applications

F20LCI as 114d* (from 11/2015)
 F45 as 214d Active Tourer (from 03/2015)
 F46 as 214d Gran Tourer (from 07/2015)
 F56 (MINI) as MINI One D 3 (from 03/2014)
 F55 (MINI) as MINI One D 5 Door(from 10/2014)

F20 as 116d (from 03/2015)
 F20LCI as 116d (from 11/2015)
 F20LCI as 116d ED (from 11/2015)
 F21LCI as 116d (from 11/2015)
 F21LCI as 116d ED (from 11/2015)
 F44 as 216d Gran Coupé (from 2020)
 F45 as 216d Active Tourer (from 11/2014)
 F46 as 216d Gran Tourer (from 03/2015)
 F48 as X1 sDrive16d (from 10/2015)
 F56 (MINI) as MINI Cooper D 3 Door (from 03/2014)
 F55 (MINI) as MINI Cooper D 5 Door (from 10/2014)
 F40 as 116d (from 07/2019)

*Available in select markets (e.g. Portugal); The 114d was removed with the LCI2 in late 2017

References 
;
;

External links 
 The UnixNerd's BMW B37 engine page  with photos, history and common problems.

BMW engines
Straight-three engines
Diesel engines